The Virgin Years – Souvenir Box is a three-CD limited edition box set by English avant-rock group Henry Cow. It was released in 1991 by Recommended Records and East Side Digital Records, and contains three albums Henry Cow made for Virgin Records between 1973 and 1975, Legend, Unrest and In Praise of Learning. Included in the box set is a 24-page souvenir booklet and a Henry Cow fold-out family-tree.

Track listings
The CDs in this box set are as released by East Side Digital Records in 1991, which include bonus tracks and remixed versions of Legend and In Praise of Learning.

Disc 1: Legend

Disc 2: Unrest

Disc 3: In Praise of Learning

Personnel
Fred Frith – guitars, violin, viola, xylophone, piano, voice
Tim Hodgkinson – organ, piano, alto saxophone, clarinet, voice
John Greaves – bass guitar, piano, voice
Chris Cutler – drums, piano, voice
Geoff Leigh – saxophones, flute, clarinet, recorder, voice
Lindsay Cooper – bassoon, oboe, recorder, voice
Dagmar Krause – voice
Peter Blegvad – guitar, voice, clarinet
Anthony Moore – piano, electronics and tapework

Remixes
Disc 1 is a remixed version of Legend by Tim Hodgkinson and Fred Frith at Cold Storage and Red Shop Studios in May/August 1990. The bonus track "Bellycan" is an outtake from Henry Cow's Greasy Truckers Live at Dingwalls Dance Hall recording session in November 1973.

Disc 2 was not remixed. The bonus tracks "Torchfire" and "The Glove" were derived from raw material recorded during the Unrest sessions, and were mixed by Hodgkinson at Cold Storage Studios in 1984.

Disc 3 is a remixed version of In Praise of Learning by Frith, Hodgkinson and Martin Bisi at BC studios, New York in April 1985, and at Cold Storage studios by Hodgkinson. The bonus track "Lovers of Gold" is an alternate version of "Beginning: The Long March" created by Chris Cutler.

See also
Henry Cow Box (2006)
The 40th Anniversary Henry Cow Box Set (2009)

Footnotes

Henry Cow albums
1991 compilation albums
Recommended Records compilation albums